Cupressus stephensonii is a species of conifer known as the Cuyamaca cypress, and is endemic to Southern California. It has been classified as Hesperocyparis stephensonii. It was previously listed as Cupressus arizonica subsp. stephensonii and Cupressus arizonica var. glabra.

Distribution
The Cuyamaca Cypress exists only in the headwaters area of King Creek in the Cuyamaca Mountains of the Peninsular Ranges system, south of Cuyamaca Peak within San Diego County in extreme Southern California.

Most individual trees occur at  within the Pacific Southwest Research Station's King Creek Research Natural Area, in the Cleveland National Forest.

Conservation
It is an IUCN Red List Critically Endangered species, and a California Native Plant Society Inventory of Rare and Endangered Plants listed Seriously endangered species.  The entire native (world) population of the tree was reduced down to thirty to forty individual trees by the 2003 Cedar Fire.

Description

It usually forms a spreading tree with a central leader, only slightly taller than it is wide.

The tree's female cones are about 10 mm in diameter, while cone scales are normally 6–8 mm. Often, but not always, they have conspicuous umbos 3–4 mm, which are high and conical. There are normally 100-125 seeds per cone, not at all glaucous. 3-4 cotyledons are usually present. It is the only cypress species in California to release pollen in the summertime.

Taxonomy variations
The more recent classification name Hesperocyparis stephensonii has been used by botanists of the United States Department of Agriculture, the University and Jepson Herbaria, and the California Native Plant Society since 2010. Hesperocyparis is a genus of New World species formerly in Cupressus, now a genus of Old World species.

Cupressus stephensonii has sometimes been classified as Cupressus arizonica subsp. stephensonii,  as a subspecies of Arizona cypress (Cupressus arizonica), and/or as the variety Cupressus arizonica var. glabra. It can be hard to distinguish the them, one of the main distinguishing characteristics is the color of the smooth bark on mature trees which varies from pink to grey to pure white, as well as the mature form which tends to be much more spreading than C. arizonica. The listing of Cupressus stephensonii as a subspecies of Cupressus arizonica is debatable, further molecular analysis may help define the taxonomy.

See also
Cupressus forbesii — nearby endemic Cypress/Hesperocyparis sp.

References

Further reading
Wolf, C. B. & Wagener, W. E. (1948). The New World Cypresses. El Aliso 1: 195-205.
palomar.edu: The True Cypresses (Genus Cupressus = Callitropsis) "Isolated Groves In Western North America" -  (web.article)

External links
CalFlora Database: Hesperocyparis stephensonii (Cuyamaca cypress) — formerly Cupressus stephensoniia.
Jepson eFlora (TJM2) treatment of Hesperocyparis stephensonii — ''formerly Cupressus stephensoniia + Cupressus arizonica var. glabra.
 USDA Plants Profile for Hesperocyparis stephensonii (Cuyamaca cypress) — formerly Cupressus stephensonii + Cupressus arizonica subsp. stephensonii. 
Conifers.org - Cupressus stephensonii
Cupressus.net: Images of Cupressus stephensonii
Pacific Southwest Research Stations, Cleveland National Forest King Creek Research Natural Area — with in-situ photos + info.
UC CalPhotos gallery of Hesperocyparis stephensonii

stephensonii
Endemic flora of California
Trees of the Southwestern United States
Cuyamaca Mountains
Natural history of the California chaparral and woodlands
Natural history of the Peninsular Ranges
Natural history of San Diego County, California
Cleveland National Forest
Plants described in 1948
Critically endangered flora of California